Carposina lembula is a moth in the Carposinidae family. It was described by Edward Meyrick in 1910. It is found on Java.

References

Natural History Museum Lepidoptera generic names catalog

Carposinidae
Moths described in 1910
Moths of Indonesia